Carotid artery dissection is a separation of the layers of the artery wall supplying oxygen-bearing blood to the head and brain and is the most common cause of stroke in young adults.  (Dissection is a blister-like de-lamination between the outer and inner walls of a blood vessel, generally originating with a partial leak in the inner lining.)
 

Dissection may occur after physical trauma to the neck, such as a blunt injury (e.g. traffic collision), strangulation, but can also happen spontaneously.

Signs and symptoms

The signs and symptoms of carotid artery dissection may be divided into ischemic and non-ischemic categories:

Non-ischemic signs and symptoms:
 Localised headache, particularly around one of the eyes
 Neck pain
 Swollen tongue
 Decreased pupil size with drooping of the upper eyelid (Horner syndrome)
 Pulsatile tinnitus

Ischemic signs and symptoms:
 Temporary vision loss
 Ischemic stroke

Causes 

The causes of internal carotid artery dissection can be broadly categorized into two classes: spontaneous or traumatic.

Spontaneous 

Once considered uncommon, spontaneous carotid artery dissection is an increasingly recognized cause of stroke that preferentially affects the middle-aged.

The incidence of spontaneous carotid artery dissection is low, and incidence rates for internal carotid artery dissection have been reported to be 2.6 to 2.9 per 100,000.

Observational studies and case reports published since the early 1980s show that patients with spontaneous internal carotid artery dissection may also have a history of stroke in their family and/or hereditary connective tissue disorders, such as Marfan syndrome, Ehlers-Danlos syndrome, autosomal dominant polycystic kidney disease, pseudoxanthoma elasticum, fibromuscular dysplasia, and osteogenesis imperfecta type I. IgG4-related disease involving the carotid artery has also been observed as a cause.

However, although an association with connective tissue disorders does exist, most people with spontaneous arterial dissections do not have associated connective tissue disorders. Also, the reports on the prevalence of hereditary connective tissue diseases in people with spontaneous dissections are highly variable, ranging from 0% to 0.6% in one study to 5% to 18% in another study.

Internal carotid artery dissection can also be associated with an elongated styloid process (known as Eagle syndrome when the elongated styloid process causes symptoms).

Traumatic 

Carotid artery dissection is thought to be more commonly caused by severe violent trauma to the head and/or neck.  An estimated 0.67% of patients admitted to the hospital after major motor vehicle accidents were found to have blunt carotid injury, including intimal dissections, pseudoaneurysms, thromboses, or fistulas. Of these, 76% had intimal dissections, pseudoaneurysms, or a combination of the two. Sports-related activities such as surfing and Jiu-Jitsu have been reported as causes of carotid artery dissection.

The probable mechanism of injury for most internal carotid injuries is rapid deceleration, with resultant hyperextension and rotation of the neck, which stretches the internal carotid artery over the upper cervical vertebrae, producing an intimal tear. After such an injury, the patient may remain asymptomatic, have a hemispheric transient ischemic event, or have a stroke.

Artery dissection has also been reported in association with some forms of neck manipulation. There is significant controversy about the level of risk of stroke from neck manipulation. It may be that manipulation can cause dissection, or it may be that the dissection is already present in some people who seek manipulative treatment. At this time, conclusive evidence does not exist to support either a strong association between neck manipulation and stroke, or no association.

Pathophysiology
Arterial dissection of the carotid arteries occurs when a small tear forms in the innermost lining of the arterial wall (known as the tunica intima).  Blood is then able to enter the space between the inner and outer layers of the vessel, causing narrowing (stenosis) or complete occlusion.  The stenosis that occurs in the early stages of arterial dissection is a dynamic process and some occlusions can return to stenosis very quickly.  When complete occlusion occurs, it may lead to ischaemia.  Often, even a complete occlusion is totally asymptomatic because bilateral circulation keeps the brain well perfused.  However, when blood clots form and break off from the site of the tear, they form emboli, which can travel through the arteries to the brain and block the blood supply to the brain, resulting in an ischaemic stroke, otherwise known as a cerebral infarction.  Blood clots, or emboli, originating from the dissection are thought to be the cause of infarction in the majority of cases of stroke in the presence of carotid artery dissection.  Cerebral infarction causes irreversible damage to the brain. In one study of patients with carotid artery dissection, 60% had infarcts documented on neuroimaging.

Treatment
The goal of treatment is to prevent the development or continuation of neurologic deficits. Treatments include observation, anti-platelet agents, anticoagulation, stent implantation, carotid endarterectomy, and carotid artery ligation.

Epidemiology
70% of patients with carotid arterial dissection are between the ages of 35 and 50, with a mean age of 47 years.

See also
 Aortic dissection
 Vertebral artery dissection

References

External links 

Diseases of the aorta
Vascular diseases
Medical emergencies